The University of Kansas School of Business is a public business school on the main campus of the University of Kansas in Lawrence, Kansas. The KU School of Business was founded in 1924 and has more than 100 faculty members and approximately 1500 students.

The Association to Advance Collegiate Schools of Business has accredited the KU School of Business for its business and accounting programs. KU is one of only three universities in the Kansas City region to offer an MBA degree with this highest and most prestigious accreditation level.

Majors and concentrations 
The KU School of Business offers undergraduate, graduate and Ph.D. programs across disciplines.

Bachelor of Science in Business programs are offered in six majors and four optional concentrations.

The small Ph.D. program admits six or seven new students each year who work closely with faculty. Students can specialize in the following concentrations: Accounting, Information Systems, Finance, Marketing, Decision Sciences, Human Resources Management, Organizational Behavior, and Strategic Management.

International experience 
More than one-third of KU Business undergraduate students study abroad – tripling the national average – and one-half of the School's full-time graduate students take advantage of at least one overseas opportunity at KU. In addition, seventy percent of KU Business faculty have conducted international research or taught abroad in the last three years.

Public Lecture Series 
The KU School of Business offers several free, public lectures each year that bring national and international authorities to campus to share their perspective on major issues.

The Anderson W. Chandler Lecture Series began in 1997 and is made possible by alumnus Anderson Chandler, CEO, president and director of Fidelity State Bank and Trust Co. in Topeka, Kansas. Recent lectures have included Alan Mulally (2007), Matthew K. Rose (2006) and Michael Powell (2005).

The Walter S. Sutton Lecture Series began in 1993 to honor Walter Sutton and his lifelong dedication to ethical business practices. Recent lectures have included Ray Anderson (2008), Peter Eigen (2007), and Jim Webb (2004).

The J.A. Vickers, Sr. and Robert F. Vickers, Sr. Lecture Series began in 1969 and is named in honor of the pioneers of the oil industry in Kansas. Recent lectures have included Chief Justice of the United States John G. Roberts, Jr. (2008), John Kasich (2007), Jack Kemp (2006) and J.C. Watts (2003).

Location 
The KU School of Business is located in Capitol Federal Hall, which is on the south side of the campus, across from Hoglund Ball Park and Allen Fieldhouse.  Lecturers, teacher's assistants, and professors hold open office hours for students in Capitol Federal Hall.

Research centers and institutes 
 Institute for International Business (IIB)
 Center for International Business Education and Research (CIBER)
 Center for Applied Economics
 Center for Auditing Research and Advanced Technology (CARAT)
 Center for Research in Entrepreneurial Activity (CREA)
 International Center for Ethics in Business (ICEB)
 KU Small Business Development Center

References

External links 
 

University of Kansas
Business schools in Kansas
Educational institutions established in 1924
1924 establishments in Kansas